Ryan Brunt (born November 18, 1985 in Portage, Wisconsin) is an American curler. He is currently the lead for the Pete Fenson rink. He lives in Bloomington, Minnesota and curls out of the St. Paul Curling Club. He curls with a left-hand delivery.

Career
Brunt began curling in 1992.  He participated in various bonspiels in high school and won the Wisconsin State High School Champions in 2001. He played in the United States Men's Junior Curling Championship five times, and his best finish was bronze in 2007.

Brunt began to curl with Pete Fenson and teammates Shawn Rojeski and Joe Polo during the 2010-11 curling season. His first appearance with the Fenson rink was at the 2011 Continental Cup of Curling, where he and Team North America won the cup over Team World. He participated with the Fenson rink in the 2011 United States Men's Curling Championship, where they won the right to represent the United States at the world championship in Regina, Saskatchewan. He and his team started off well but lost many close games and finished in 10th place with a 3–8 win–loss record.

Personal life
Brunt graduated from the University of Wisconsin–Eau Claire with a double major in math and economics. He is currently a substitute teacher, and enjoys playing golf. His sister, Maureen Clark, is a world junior champion who competed on the United States's women's curling team at the 2006 Torino Olympics.

Teams

References

External links
 
 TeamUSA profile

American male curlers
1985 births
Living people
University of Wisconsin–Eau Claire alumni
People from Portage, Wisconsin
American curling champions